John Bew is Professor in History and Foreign Policy at King's College London and from 2013 to 2014 held the Henry A. Kissinger Chair in Foreign Policy and International Relations at the John W. Kluge Center.

In 2019, Bew joined the Number 10 Policy Unit under Prime Minister Boris Johnson.

Biography
Bew is the son of Paul Bew, Professor of Irish Politics at Queen's University Belfast and his wife Greta Jones, a history professor at the University of Ulster.

Bew completed his education at Pembroke College, Cambridge, where he was a Foundation Scholar and a Thornton Scholar and attained a first class BA in History. He won the Member's Prize for the best MPhil in Historical Studies, before completing  his doctoral dissertation 'Politics, identity and the shaping of Unionism in the north of Ireland, from the French Revolution to the Home Rule Crisis' in 2006. From 2007 to 2010, Bew was Lecturer in Modern British History, Harris Fellow and Director of Studies at Peterhouse, Cambridge, where he was previously a Junior Research Fellow.

Bew is a contributing writer for the New Statesman and the author of several books, including Realpolitik: A History (2015) and Castlereagh: Enlightenment, War and Tyranny, published by Quercus in the UK in 2011 and by Oxford University Press in the United States the following year.

Bew's original work on Castlereagh formed the basis for a 2013 BBC NI documentary that he presented.

Citizen Clem, published in 2016, was named a 'book of the year' in The Times, The Sunday Times, Evening Standard, The Spectator and New Statesman and received excellent reviews in The Guardian, The Observer, Literary Review and London Review of Books. It was also awarded the 2017 Elizabeth Longford Prize for Historical Biography and 2017 Orwell Prize. Phillip Collins, for The Times, described it as 'The best book in the field of British politics'.

In 2015, Bew was awarded a Philip Leverhulme Prize for Politics and International Relations. He also heads London think-tank Policy Exchange’s Britain in the World Project, launched by the UK Secretary of State for Defence in March 2016, and coordinates its work on foreign policy. His most recent book is Realpolitik: A History published in 2016 by Oxford University Press.

Bew is an avid fan of Manchester United FC and used to play non-league football for Milton Rovers FC.

British prime minister Boris Johnson selected Bew to lead an "integrated review of security, defense, development and foreign policy."

Bibliography

Monographs 

 Castlereagh: Enlightenment, War and Tyranny. Quercus Publishing. 2011.
 Realpolitik: A History. Oxford University Press. 2015.
 Citizen Clem: A Biography of Attlee. riverrun. 2016.

References

Academics of King's College London
British historians
Sons of life peers
Historians of the British Isles
British special advisers
British non-fiction writers
Alumni of Pembroke College, Cambridge
British biographers
International relations scholars